ISO 3166-2:CY is the entry for Cyprus in ISO 3166-2, part of the ISO 3166 standard published by the International Organization for Standardization (ISO), which defines codes for the names of the principal subdivisions (e.g., provinces or states) of all countries coded in ISO 3166-1.

Currently for Cyprus, ISO 3166-2 codes are defined for 6 districts.

Each code consists of two parts, separated by a hyphen. The second part is two digits (01–06).

Current codes
Subdivision names are listed as in the ISO 3166-2 standard published by the ISO 3166 Maintenance Agency (ISO 3166/MA).

ISO 639-1 codes are used to represent subdivision names in the following administrative languages:
 (el): Greek
 (tr): Turkish

There are six districts (el: , eparchies;).

 Notes

The full name of Cyprus in ISO 3166 is the Republic of Cyprus. Yet Cyprus is de facto divided into the Republic of Cyprus, and the Turkish Republic of Northern Cyprus with limited recognition. Thus not all of the territory of the districts is controlled by the government of the Republic of Cyprus; see Northern Cyprus.

The British Overseas Territory of Akrotiri and Dhekelia (which consists of military bases) does not have an ISO 3166 code.

Changes
The following changes to the entry are listed on ISO's online catalogue, the Online Browsing Platform:

See also 
 Subdivisions of Cyprus
 FIPS region codes of Cyprus
 NUTS codes of Cyprus

References

External links
 ISO Online Browsing Platform: CY
 Districts of Cyprus, Statoids.com

2:CY
ISO 3166-2
Cyprus geography-related lists